Yuval Noah Harari (born 1976) is an Israeli public intellectual, historian and professor in the Department of History at the Hebrew University of Jerusalem. He is the author of the popular science bestsellers Sapiens: A Brief History of Humankind (2014), Homo Deus: A Brief History of Tomorrow (2016), and 21 Lessons for the 21st Century (2018). His writings examine free will, consciousness, intelligence, happiness, and suffering.

Harari writes about a  "cognitive revolution"  that supposedly occurred roughly 70,000 years ago when Homo sapiens supplanted the rival Neanderthals and other species of the genus Homo, developed language skills and structured societies, and ascended as apex predators, aided by the agricultural revolution and accelerated by the scientific revolution, which have allowed humans to approach near mastery over their environment. His books also examine the possible consequences of a futuristic biotechnological world in which intelligent biological organisms are surpassed by their own creations; he has said, "Homo sapiens as we know them will disappear in a century or so".

In Sapiens: A Brief History of Humankind, Harari surveys human history from the evolutionary emergence of Homo sapiens to 21st-century political and technological revolutions. The book is based on his lectures to an undergraduate world history class.

Early life
Yuval Noah Harari was born and raised in Kiryat Ata, Israel, one of three children born to Shlomo and Pnina Harari. His family was a secular Jewish family. His father was a state-employed armaments engineer and his mother was an office administrator. Harari taught himself to read at age three. He studied in a class for intellectually gifted children at the Leo Baeck Education Center in Haifa from the age of eight. He deferred mandatory military service in the Israel Defense Forces to pursue university studies as part of the Atuda program but was later exempted from completing his military service following his studies due to health issues. He began studying history and international relations at the Hebrew University of Jerusalem at age 17.

Academic career
Harari first specialized in medieval history and military history in his studies from 1993 to 1998 at the Hebrew University of Jerusalem. He completed his D.Phil. degree at Jesus College, Oxford, in 2002, under the supervision of Steven J. Gunn. From 2003 to 2005, he pursued postdoctoral studies in history as a Yad Hanadiv Fellow. While at Oxford, Harari first encountered the writings of Jared Diamond, whom he has acknowledged as an influence on his own writing. At a Berggruen Institute salon, Harari said that Diamond's Guns, Germs, and Steel “was kind of an epiphany in my academic career. I realized that I could actually write such books.”

Literary career
Harari has published numerous books and articles, including Special Operations in the Age of Chivalry, 1100–1550; The Ultimate Experience: Battlefield Revelations and the Making of Modern War Culture, 1450–2000; The Concept of 'Decisive Battles' in World History; and Armchairs, Coffee and Authority: Eye-witnesses and Flesh-witnesses Speak about War, 1100–2000. He now specializes in world history and macro-historical processes.

His book Sapiens: A Brief History of Humankind was originally published in Hebrew in 2011 based on the 20 lectures of an undergraduate world history class he was teaching. It was then released in English in 2014 and has since been translated into some 45 additional languages. The book surveys the entire length of human history, starting from the evolution of Homo sapiens in the Stone Age. Harari compares indigenous peoples to apes in his fall of man narrative, leading up to the political and technological revolutions of the 21st century. The Hebrew edition became a bestseller in Israel, and generated much interest among the general public, turning Harari into a celebrity. Joseph Drew wrote that "Sapiens provides a wide-ranging and thought-provoking introduction for students of comparative civilization," considering it as a work that "highlights the importance and wide expanse of the social sciences."

Harari's follow-up book, Homo Deus: A Brief History of Tomorrow, was published in 2016 and examines the possibilities for the future of Homo sapiens. The book's premise outlines that, in the future, humanity is likely to make a significant attempt to gain happiness, immortality and God-like powers. The book goes on to openly speculate various ways this ambition might be realised for Homo sapiens in the future based on the past and present. Among several possibilities for the future, Harari develops the term dataism for a philosophy or mindset that worships big data. Writing in The New York Times Book Review, Siddhartha Mukherjee stated that although the book "fails to convince me entirely," he considers it "essential reading for those who think about the future."

Harari's book, 21 Lessons for the 21st Century, published on 30 August 2018, focused more on present-day concerns. A review in the New Statesman commented on what it called "risible moral dictums littered throughout the text", criticised Harari's writing style and stated that he was "trafficking in pointless asides and excruciating banalities." Kirkus Reviews praised the book as a "tour de force" and described it as a "highly instructive exploration of current affairs and the immediate future of human societies.”

In November 2020 the first volume of his graphic adaptation of Sapiens: A Brief History of Humankind, Sapiens: A Graphic History – The Birth of Humankind, co-authored with David Vandermeulen and Daniel Casanave, was published and launched at a livestream event organised by How to Academy and Penguin Books.

In 2022, Harari's latest book, Unstoppable Us: How Humans Took Over the World, illustrated by Ricard Zaplana Ruiz, was published and is a "Story of Human History — for Kids." In fewer than 200 pages of child-friendly language, Harari covers the same content as his best-selling book Sapiens: A Brief History of Humankind, but "he has simplified the presentation for this younger audience without dumbing it down."  This book is "the first of four planned volumes."

In November, 2022, he stated in an interview with CNN that "You have just one country, between the Jordan River and the Mediterranean with three classes of people living there. Jews, who have all the rights; some Arabs, who have some rights; and other Arabs, who have very little or no rights," [] "This is increasingly also the aspiration, or mindset of some people even in the government."

Personal life
Harari is gay and in 2002 met his husband Itzik Yahav, whom he has called "my internet of all things". Yahav has also been Harari's personal manager. They married in a civil ceremony in Toronto, Canada.

In 2018 Harari said Vipassana meditation, which he began whilst in Oxford in 2000, has "transformed my life". As of 2017 he practised for two hours every day (one hour at the start and end of his work day), every year undertook a meditation retreat of 30 days or longer, in silence and with no books or social media, and is an assistant meditation teacher. He dedicated Homo Deus to "my teacher, S. N. Goenka, who lovingly taught me important things", and said "I could not have written this book without the focus, peace and insight gained from practising Vipassana for fifteen years." He also regards meditation as a way to research.

Harari is a vegan and says this resulted from his research, including his view that the foundation of the dairy industry is breaking the bond between mother cow and calf. As of May 2021, Harari did not have a smartphone.

In a 2020 interview, Harari talks about his place of residence and says, "I live in a kind of middle-class suburb of Tel Aviv."

During the COVID-19 pandemic, following former United States President Donald Trump's cut to WHO funding, Harari announced that he and his husband would donate $1 million to the WHO through Sapienship, their social impact company.

Awards and recognition
Harari twice won the Polonsky Prize for "Creativity and Originality", in 2009 and 2012. In 2011, he won the Society for Military History's Moncado Award for outstanding articles in military history. In 2012, he was elected to the Young Israeli Academy of Sciences.

Sapiens was in the top 3 of The New York Times Best Seller list for 96 consecutive weeks. In 2018, Harari gave the first TED Talk as a digital avatar.

In 2017, Homo Deus won Handelsblatt's German Economic Book Award for the most thoughtful and influential economic book of the year.

In 2018 and 2020, Harari spoke at the World Economic Forum annual conference in Davos.

Controversy
In July 2019, Harari was widely criticised for allowing several omissions and amendments in the Russian edition of his third book 21 Lessons for the 21st Century, using a softer tone when speaking about Russian authorities. Leonid Bershidsky in Moscow Times called it "caution — or, to call it by its proper name, cowardice", and Nettanel Slyomovics in Haaretz claimed that "he is sacrificing those same liberal ideas that he presumes to represent". In a response, Harari stated that he "was warned that due to these few examples Russian censorship will not allow distribution of a Russian translation of the book" and that he "therefore faced a dilemma," namely to "replace these few examples with other examples, and publish the book in Russia," or "change nothing, and publish nothing," and that he "preferred publishing, because Russia is a leading global power and it seemed important that the book’s ideas should reach readers in Russia, especially as the book is still very critical of the Putin regime – just without naming names."

Critical reception 
Harari's popular writings are considered to belong to the Big History genre, with Ian Parker writing in 2020 in the New Yorker that "Harari did not invent Big History, but updated it with hints of self-help and futurology, as well as a high-altitude, almost nihilistic composure about human suffering."

His work has been more negatively received in academic circles, with Christopher Robert Hallpike stating 2020 in a review of Sapiens that: "one has often had to point out how surprisingly little he seems to have read on quite a number of essential topics. It would be fair to say that whenever his facts are broadly correct they are not new, and whenever he tries to strike out on his own he often gets things wrong, sometimes seriously." Hallpike further states that: "we should not judge Sapiens as a serious contribution to knowledge but as 'infotainment', a publishing event to titillate its readers by a wild intellectual ride across the landscape of history, dotted with sensational displays of speculation, and ending with blood-curdling predictions about human destiny. By these criteria, it is a most successful book."

On 22 July 2022, Current Affairs (magazine) published the article "The Dangerous Populist Science of Yuval Noah Harari", pointing out the lack of scientific support throughout his books: "The best-selling author is a gifted storyteller and popular speaker. But he sacrifices science for sensationalism, and his work is riddled with errors."

In November 2022, the Frankfurter Allgemeine Zeitung called Harari a historian and a brand. They pointed out that the Yahav Harari Group, built by his partner Yahaf, was a "booming product cosmos" selling comics and children’s books, but soon films and documentaries. They observed an "icy deterministic touch" in his books which made them so popular in Silicon Valley. They stated that his listeners celebrated him like a pop star, even though he only had the sad message that people are "bad algorithms", soon to be redundant, to be replaced because machines could do it better.

Published works

Books
 Renaissance Military Memoirs: War, History and Identity, 1450–1600 (Woodbridge: Boydell & Brewer, 2004), 
 Special Operations in the Age of Chivalry, 1100–1550 (Woodbridge: Boydell & Brewer, 2007), 
 The Ultimate Experience: Battlefield Revelations and the Making of Modern War Culture, 1450–2000 (Houndmills: Palgrave-Macmillan, 2008), 
 Sapiens: A Brief History of Humankind (London: Harvill Secker, 2014) 
 Homo Deus: A Brief History of Tomorrow (2016), 
 Money: Vintage Minis (select excerpts from Sapiens and Homo Deus (London: Penguin Random House, 2018) 
 21 Lessons for the 21st Century (London: Jonathan Cape, 2018), 
 Sapiens: A Graphic History, Volume 1 – The Birth of Humankind (London: Jonathan Cape, 2020)
 Sapiens: A Graphic History, Volume 2 − The Pillars of Civilization (London: Jonathan Cape, 2021)
 Unstoppable Us, Volume 1 − How Humans Took Over the World (Bright Matter Books, 2022),

Articles
 "The Military Role of the Frankish Turcopoles – a Reassessment", Mediterranean Historical Review 12 (1) (June 1997), pp. 75–116.
 "Inter-Frontal Cooperation in the Fourteenth Century and Edward III’s 1346 Campaign", War in History 6 (4) (September 1999), pp. 379–395
 "Strategy and Supply in Fourteenth-Century Western European Invasion Campaigns", The Journal of Military History 64 (2) (April 2000), pp. 297–334.
 "Eyewitnessing in Accounts of the First Crusade: The Gesta Francorum and Other Contemporary Narratives", Crusades 3 (August 2004), pp. 77–99
 "Martial Illusions: War and Disillusionment in Twentieth-Century and Renaissance Military Memoirs", The Journal of Military History 69 (1) (January 2005), pp. 43–72
 "Military Memoirs: A Historical Overview of the Genre from the Middle Ages to the Late Modern Era", War in History 14:3 (2007), pp. 289–309
 "The Concept of ‘Decisive Battles’ in World History", The Journal of World History 18 (3) (2007), 251–266
 "Knowledge, Power and the Medieval Soldier, 1096–1550", in In Laudem Hierosolymitani: Studies in Crusades and Medieval Culture in Honour of Benjamin Z. Kedar, ed. Iris Shagrir, Ronnie Ellenblum and Jonathan Riley-Smith, (Ashgate, 2007)
 "Combat Flow: Military, Political and Ethical Dimensions of Subjective Well-Being in War", Review of General Psychology (September 2008)
 Introduction to Peter Singer's Animal Liberation, The Bodley Head, 2015.
 "Armchairs, Coffee and Authority: Eye-witnesses and Flesh-witnesses Speak about War, 1100–2000", Journal of Military History 74:1 (gennaio, 2010), pp. 53–78.
 "Yuval Noah Harari on big data, Google and the end of free will", Financial Times (August 2016).
 "Why It’s No Longer Possible for Any Country to Win a War", Time (23 June 2017).
 "Why Technology Favors Tyranny", The Atlantic (October 2018).
 "Yuval Noah Harari: the world after coronavirus", Financial Times (20 March 2020).
 "Why Vladimir Putin has already lost this war", The Guardian (28 February 2022)
 "The End of the New Peace"  https://www.theatlantic.com/ideas/archive/2022/12/putin-russian-ukraine-war-global-peace/672385/

References

External links

 Jan Michalski Prize for Literature, official website
 
 Meet the author – Yuval Harari video interview – BBC News
 
 

1976 births
Living people
21st-century Israeli historians
Alumni of Jesus College, Oxford
Big History
Jewish atheists
Gay academics
Israeli gay writers
Hebrew University of Jerusalem alumni
Academic staff of the Hebrew University of Jerusalem
Israeli futurologists
Israeli medievalists
Israeli people of Lebanese-Jewish descent
Israeli social commentators
Israeli transhumanists
Israeli military historians
Israeli atheists
Gay Jews
People from Kiryat Ata
Technology commentators
Theorists on Western civilization
World historians
LGBT educators